A fleshy cone (megastrobilus); chiefly relating to those borne by junipers and cypresses, and often mistakenly called a berry. These cones (galbuli) are formed by fleshy cone scales which accrete into a single mass under a unified epidermis. Although originally used for the cypresses, the term is more applicable to the junipers.

References

Plant morphology